Panagiota "Nota" Klentrou is a professor at Brock University known for her research on sport training in children. She is an elected fellow of the Canadian Society for Exercise Physiology.

Early life and education 
Klentrou was born and raised in Athens, Greece. She received a B.Sc. (1981) in Physical Education and Sport Science from the National and Kapodistrian University of Athens, and an MSc (1987) and PhD (1991) in Exercise Physiology from the University of Montréal, Québec, Canada. Klentrou joined Brock University in 1996 as an assistant professor and was promoted to professor in 2007. Klentrou has served as the chair of the department of kinesiology at Brock University (2006-2011), and the associate dean (2011–2020).

Klentrou served as president of the Canadian Society for Exercise Physiology from 2017-2019.

Research 
Klentrou's research uses applied and basic science approaches to study human performance and the implications of sport training primarily in children and youth. This includes investigations into how sexual maturation, exercise, inflammation, immune responses, adiposity and nutrition affect musculoskeletal growth and development. This research is trying to identify the cellular mechanisms that explain how exercise training and dietary choices  during childhood and adolescence affects lifelong bone health. Her research has connected intensive training for gymnastics with amenorrhea in women and examined bone heatlh and recovery after exercise. She has also presented educational opportunities possible for training in rhythmic gymnastics.

Selected publications

Awards and honors 
In 2020, Klentrou was named a fellow of the Canadian Society for Exercise Physiology.

Personal life 
Klentrou was member of the Greek National Team of Rhythmic Gymnastics, and placed 6th in ribbon and 7th in clubs during the 1983 Balkan Games in Serres, Greece.

References

External links 

Living people
National and Kapodistrian University of Athens alumni
Université de Montréal alumni
Academic staff of Brock University
Sports scientists
Year of birth missing (living people)
People from Athens